Helmut Kraft (born 24 July 1958) is an Austrian football manager.

External links
 
 

1958 births
Living people
People from Hall in Tirol
Sportspeople from Tyrol (state)
Austrian football managers
SV Ried managers
Wiener Sport-Club managers
SK Vorwärts Steyr managers
LASK managers
FC Wacker Innsbruck (2002) managers
FC Juniors OÖ managers